Daniel "Dani" Lucas Segovia (born 23 May 1985) is a Spanish professional footballer who plays for AD Unión Adarve as a striker.

Club career
Born in Madrid, Segovia finished his development with local Rayo Vallecano, first appearing with the main squad during the 2004–05 season, in Segunda División B. Released in June 2006, he went on to resume his career at that level but also in the Tercera División, representing CF Fuenlabrada, Algeciras CF, Deportivo Aragón, CA Pinto, UB Conquense and CD Atlético Baleares.

Segovia moved abroad for the first time in his career in the summer of 2010, joining Austrian Football First League club SKN St. Pölten. On 12 July 2011, he played his first match as a professional, coming on as a second-half substitute in a 0–2 home loss against WAC St. Andrä. He finished his first season abroad with 17 goals, ranking third in the league's scoring charts.

After one and a half years, Segovia changed teams but stayed in Austria, signing for Bundesliga's FC Admira Wacker Mödling. He made his debut in the competition on 16 February 2013, in a 1–2 home defeat to SC Wiener Neustadt where he featured 36 minutes from the bench. On 13 April, now as a starter, he scored his first goals for his new team, netting twice in the 4–3 win against FC Wacker Innsbruck.

On 26 May 2013, Segovia scored the game's only goal at SV Mattersburg in the last matchday, helping Admira leapfrog their opponent to finish in ninth position and thus barely avoid relegation. In the off-season, he transferred to Wolfsberger AC of the same league.

On 2 February 2017, Segovia left St. Pölten and signed a six-month deal at Neftçi PFK from the Azerbaijan Premier League. His contract was terminated by mutual consent on 29 January 2018.

Segovia joined Indian Super League side Bengaluru FC on 15 February 2018, as a replacement for injured compatriot Braulio Nóbrega. He returned to his homeland on 9 August, agreeing to a one-year contract at Racing de Santander.

Club statistics

References

External links

1985 births
Living people
Spanish footballers
Footballers from Madrid
Association football forwards
Segunda División B players
Tercera División players
Segunda Federación players
Rayo Vallecano B players
Rayo Vallecano players
CF Fuenlabrada footballers
Algeciras CF footballers
Real Zaragoza B players
UB Conquense footballers
CD Atlético Baleares footballers
Racing de Santander players
CD Badajoz players
UCAM Murcia CF players
SD Ejea players
Austrian Football Bundesliga players
2. Liga (Austria) players
SKN St. Pölten players
FC Admira Wacker Mödling players
Wolfsberger AC players
Azerbaijan Premier League players
Neftçi PFK players
Indian Super League players
Bengaluru FC players
Spanish expatriate footballers
Expatriate footballers in Austria
Expatriate footballers in Azerbaijan
Expatriate footballers in India
Spanish expatriate sportspeople in Austria
Spanish expatriate sportspeople in Azerbaijan
Spanish expatriate sportspeople in India